The Perumba River is a 51 km long river which flows through the Kannur and Kasargod districts of the Malabar region in Kerala, India. The town of Payyannur is situated on the banks of this river subsequently the river is locally known as Payyannur River.

Course
The Perumba River originates in the foothills of the Western Ghats near Thimiry in the hilly eastern part of the Kannur district. The river then flows through several hilly towns of Kannur district namely, Vellora, Palathadathil, Panapuzha, Kuttur and Mathamangalam. Then it enters into the Malabar plains where it flows through the towns of Kadannappally, Kanayi, Kandankaly and  Kungimangalam. At reaching Kungimangalam it splits into two distributaries, one flows towards north passing through Payyannur and empties into the Kavvai estuary along with the Kuppam river.The second distributary turns south flowing through Theckumbad, Palakode, Madayi and eventually emptying into the Arabian Sea near the Ezhimala hill.

Tributaries 
Vannathi River: This tributary originates from Alakkode-Eramam-Kuttoor region of Western Ghats and flows through Mathamangalam. The Peruma River is also known as Panappuzha near Mathamangalam.
Kallamkulam Totti/Pangadam Thodu: Two arms of this tributary originate from the east and south side of Kallamkunnu near Echilamvayal. It flows through Thotti and Orikkamvay Vayal. It then flows through Korom and merges with the Perumba River near Korom kaipad.

Rivers of Kannur district